A wagon train is a group of wagons traveling together.

Wagon Train may also refer to:

 Wagon Train, a 1957-1965 American Western television series
 Wagon Train (film), a 1940 American film directed by Edward Killy and starring Tim Holt
 Wagon Train (1960 film), the working title of the film Heller in Pink Tights
 The Wagon Train (Lucky Luke), the English language title of the Lucky Luke graphic novel adventure La Caravane
 Wagon Train of 1843, a mass migration of emigrants heading for Oregon in the year 1843